The Korg's Polyphonic Ensemble PE-2000 is a series of preset-based analogue orchestral instrument synthesizers and was released by Korg in 1976 and was manufactured in Japan. Each key has a separate oscillator, which allows detuning between notes to thicken the sound.

Sounds
A push-button selector located on the front pannel allows different settings to be chosen, including 7 presets : Brass, Electric Piano, Harpsichord and Clavichord, Piano, Pipe Organ, Strings; in addition, there is a "Control" setting, which enables the users to create their own sounds using the front pannel controls. The presets are not changeable, and no custom setting can be saved.

Models
 PE-1000 (For percussive sounds) 68 Keys
 PE-2000 (For percussive sounds) 68 Keys

S Models
(For strings sounds) 48 keys

Notable users
 Vangelis
 Jean-Michel Jarre
 Hawkwind
 Tangerine Dream
 Edgar Froese
 Space
 Alvvays
 Kebu

References

M
Polyphonic synthesizers
1976 musical instruments